Samuel Dicker (died 1760), was an English politician who represented Plymouth in the British House of Commons in the eighteenth century, and was also responsible for the building of the first Walton Bridge in Surrey.

Dicker owned plantations in Jamaica and in 1738 was appointed a Councilor of Jamaica. He was also a land-owner of Walton on Thames and created an estate at Mount Felix.  In 1750 he built the first bridge across the River Thames at Walton  at his own expense, obtaining an Act of Parliament to enable him to do so and levy tolls. The bridge was painted in 1755 by Canaletto who referred to Il Signiore Cavaliere Dicker.

In 1754, Dicker was elected Member of Parliament for Plymouth, the port and major Royal Navy base in Devon. He held the seat until his death in 1760.  He was unmarried and Mount Felix was sold, falling into the possession of the Earls of Tankerville.

References

Year of birth missing
1760 deaths
Members of the Parliament of Great Britain for Plymouth
British MPs 1754–1761